Ecosocialists of Greece was a political party in Greece.

The party was formed in 2007 by former members of Ecological Intervention, an eco-socialist party that participated in the Coalition of the Radical Left (SYRIZA). The Greek Ecosocialists' party was a member of the Ecosocialist International Network and continued participating in SYRIZA.

In July 2013, the party decided to fully dissolve into SYRIZA to support the project of a unitary party of ecological leftists.

References

External links
 

Ecosocialist parties
Defunct socialist parties in Greece
Political parties established in 2007
2007 establishments in Greece
Political parties disestablished in 2013
2013 disestablishments in Greece
Components of Syriza